Bakshiganj is an upazila of Jamalpur District in the Division of Mymensingh, Bangladesh.

Bakshigonj Thana was converted into an upazila in 1983.

The area of the Bakshigonj town is 20.86 km2. It has a population of 65,568; male 50.97%, female 49.03%; population density is 2820 per km2. Literacy rate among the town people is 39.9%.

History
Bakshiganj Thana was established in 1982 and was converted into an upazila in 1983.

During the Bangladesh Liberation War, the Mukti Bahini attacked the Pakistan Army camp at Kamalpur several times. Colonel Abu Taher lost his left leg on 14 November 1971, in one of those attacks.

Geography
Bakshigonj is located at 25.2250°N 89.8750°E . It has a and total area of 204.3 km2. The upazila is bounded by Meghalaya state of India on the north, Islampur upazila on the south, Spreebardi upazila on the east, Dewanganj upazila on the west. The Garo Hills are on the north east part of the upazila.

Demographics

According to the 2011 Bangladesh census, Baksiganj Upazila had 52,222 households and a population of 218,930, 13.2% of whom lived in urban areas. 12.7% of the population was under the age of 5. The literacy rate (age 7 and over) was 33.1%, compared to the national average of 51.8%.

Administration
Baksiganj Upazila is divided into seven union parishads: Bagarchar, Bakshiganj, Battajore, Danua, Merurchar, Nilakhia, and Shadhurpara. The union parishads are subdivided into 25 mauzas and 199 villages.

Economy
Economy of Bakshiganj Upazila is a major agricultural, but business and human resources are one of the key pillars of the economy of this area.

Newspapers
 Daily Urmi Bangla
 Daily Gonojoy
 Saptahik Bakshiganj

See also
Upazilas of Bangladesh
Districts of Bangladesh
Divisions of Bangladesh

References

Upazilas of Jamalpur District